Meleh Chah Shureh (also Romanized as Meleh Chah Shūreh; also known as Melechah) is a village in Zirtang Rural District, Kunani District, Kuhdasht County, Lorestan Province, Iran. At the 2006 census, its population was 83, in 17 families.

References 

Towns and villages in Kuhdasht County